Mansoor Zaman (born April 14, 1980 in Peshawar) is a Pakistani professional squash player.

In 2007, Mansoor won the Governor NWFP international and then at the President PSF international 2007 when he beat his compatriot Aamir Atlas Khan.

2002
Mansoor Zaman won a silver in the individual event at the 2002 Asian Games in Busan, South Korea.

2006
Zaman won a bronze medal at the 2006 Asian Games in Doha, Qatar.

References

External links
 PSA player profile
 

1980 births
Living people
Pakistani male squash players
Asian Games medalists in squash
Asian Games silver medalists for Pakistan
Asian Games bronze medalists for Pakistan
Squash players at the 2002 Asian Games
Squash players at the 2006 Asian Games
Medalists at the 2002 Asian Games
Medalists at the 2006 Asian Games